Charles Fleming (5 April 1868 - 13 November 1948) was a Scotland international rugby union player. He was the 37th President of the Scottish Rugby Union. His regular playing position was Centre.

Rugby Union career

Amateur career

Fleming went to Fettes College and captained the rugby union side.

Fleming then played for Oxford University, while at The Queen's College, Oxford.

Fleming played for London Scottish.

Fleming played for Edinburgh Wanderers.

Provincial career

Fleming was due to play for Anglo-Scots in 1892 against Cities District but the match was called off.

Fleming turned out for the Provinces District against Cities District on 28 December 1895. It was remarked that the snow affected his game.

International career

Fleming played three times for Scotland between 1896 - 97.

Referee career

Fleming became a referee. He refereed a North of Scotland District versus Midlands District match in 1903.

Fleming refereed in the Border League in 1910.

Administrative career

Fleming became the 37th President of the Scottish Rugby Union. He served one year from 1910 to 1911.

Cricket career

Fleming played cricket at Fettes College. He played cricket at Oxford University for Mr. A. J. H. Cochrane's side.

References

1868 births
1948 deaths
Scottish rugby union players
Presidents of the Scottish Rugby Union
Rugby union players from Edinburgh
Edinburgh Wanderers RFC players
Scotland international rugby union players
Scottish rugby union referees
Scottish Districts referees
Oxford University RFC players
London Scottish F.C. players
Provinces District (rugby union) players
Border League referees